Green Desert (16 April 1983 – 9 September 2015) was an American-bred, British-trained Thoroughbred racehorse and sire.

Racing career

1985: two-year-old season
After finishing second on his racecourse debut, Green Desert won the July Stakes over six furlongs at Newmarket Racecourse. He then finished second to Nomination in the Richmond Stakes at Goodwood before dropping back to five furlongs to win the Flying Childers Stakes at Doncaster Racecourse. On his final appearance of the season he finished fourth to Luqman in the Mill Reef Stakes at Newbury.

1986: three-year-old season
Green Desert began his second season by winning the European Free Handicap over seven furlongs at Newmarket and then finished second to Dancing Brave in the 2000 Guineas. He made no impact on heavy ground in the Irish 2,000 Guineas and then finished second to Sure Blade in the St James's Palace Stakes at Royal Ascot. When brought back to sprint distances Green Desert's form improved as he won the July Cup, finished third to Last Tycoon in the William Hill Sprint Championship and won the Haydock Sprint Cup. In his last two races he finished fourth in the Prix de l'Abbaye and last of nine when tried on dirt in the Breeders' Cup Sprint.

Stud record

Standing at Shadwell Stud, Green Desert was the sire of four Champion Sprinters and seventy-two individual Stakes winners.

Green Desert was retired from stud duty in 2011 and was euthanized at the Nunnery Stud on 9 September 2015 at the age of thirty-two.

Major winners
c = colt, f = filly, g = gelding

Sire of sires
Several of Green Desert's sons became successful breeding stallions and three had exceptional success:
Cape Cross sired Ouija Board, Sea The Stars, Golden Horn, Behkabad, Able One, Seachange and Awtaad.
Invincible Spirit sired Kingman, Moonlight Cloud, Charm Spirit, Magna Grecia, Fleeting Spirit, Eqtidaar, Mayson, Lawman, Nazeef, Vale of York, Hooray, Shalaa and Rosdhu Queen.
Oasis Dream sired Midday, Muhaarar, Goldream, Power, Aqlaam, Jwala, Charming Thought, Arcano, Prohibit and Pretty Pollyanna.

Pedigree

References

1983 racehorse births
2015 racehorse deaths
Racehorses bred in Kentucky
Racehorses trained in the United Kingdom
Thoroughbred family A4